Pamela B. Gilbert (born October 3, 1958) is an American lawyer and has been a partner of the law firm Cuneo Gilbert & LaDuca, LLP since 2003, where she heads the firm's lobbying practice.  Gilbert is a noted consumer rights advocate who has testified before Congress over fifty times and made dozens of appearances in the national print and electronic media. Gilbert leads the Committee to Support Antitrust laws (COSAL), an organization supportive of antitrust legislation.

Early career and education 
Gilbert graduated magna cum laude from Tufts University with a B.A. in Mathematics in 1980 and received her J.D. degree from New York University in 1984. She was a Root-Tilden scholar at NYU Law School.

After law school, Gilbert served as Consumer Program Director at the U.S. Public Interest Research Group from 1984-1989 where she specialized in consumer protection issues. She led the effort for congressional enactment of legislation to protect children from toxic art supplies.

From 1989-1994, Gilbert was Legislative Director and later Executive Director of Public Citizen's Congress Watch, a Washington-based consumer advocacy organization.

Public service 
Gilbert served as Executive Director of the U.S. Consumer Product Safety Commission (CPSC) from 1995-2001.  In 2001 she left the government to serve as Chief Operating Officer of M&R Strategic Services, a national firm set up to lobby and conduct grassroots and media campaigns around public policy issues.

In 2009, after the election of President Barack Obama, Gilbert headed the Presidential Transition Team for the Consumer Product Safety Commission.

Post-government career 
Gilbert represented the National Association of Shareholder and Consumer Attorneys to oppose efforts in Congress to change the rules for bringing class action lawsuits.  Gilbert subsequently represented the Center for Justice & Democracy, opposing efforts in Congress to impose Federal government restrictions on malpractice laws.

2007-2009 
In 2007, Gilbert worked with public interest organizations and victims of Enron's collapse to persuade the Securities and Exchange Commission (SEC) and the Bush Administration to adopt a position in a case pending before the U.S. Supreme Court – Stoneridge Investment Partners LLC v. Scientific-Atlanta Inc. and Motorola Inc. – that would ensure that people slighted by Enron could sue the investment banks that participated in the frauds that led to Enron's failure.  Gilbert's firm held press conferences in Washington, D.C. and elsewhere, meeting with administration officials such as then-SEC Chairman Christopher Cox.

On November 15 of that same year, Gilbert testified before the Subcommittee on Commercial and Administrative Law of the House Committee on the Judiciary on "Protecting the Playroom: Holding Foreign Manufacturers Accountable for Defective Products."

In 2008, Gilbert worked with the Center for Justice and Democracy to bring before Congress families with children who developed lead poisoning from hazardous toys, to urge the passage of the Consumer Product Safety Improvement act of 2008.  This landmark legislation placed limits on the amount of lead that can be used in children's products.

Also that year, Gilbert testified before the Federal Communications Commission on behalf of consumers who were assessed fees for switching cell phone companies before their contracts expired. Her position was that such fees were unfair.  She urged the FCC not to preempt state laws and state-based lawsuits intended to protect consumers from these allegedly unfair practices by cell phone companies.

Over the course of three years from 2007–2009, Gilbert organized a coalition of over a dozen labor and nonprofit organizations to support legislation that would provide a pathway for the approval of generic versions of costly medicines.  A version of this legislation was later incorporated in national health care reform policies.

In 2009, Gilbert worked with people injured by defects in Chrysler and General Motors vehicles to urge the Obama administration and the automobile companies to modify their bankruptcy agreements to ensure that personal injury victims would have an opportunity to receive compensation.  As a result, the agreements were modified to allow people injured in the future by vehicles manufactured before the bankruptcy to be compensated for their injuries.

2010 
On February 4, 2010, Gilbert participated in a webcast sponsored by OMB Watch on "The Obama Administration and Public Protections."

On behalf of the Committee to Support the Antitrust Laws, Gilbert worked with Congress and the Obama Administration to amend the Antitrust Criminal Penalty Enhancement and Reform Act to ensure that members of criminal antitrust conspiracies adequately cooperate with civil lawsuits in return for reduced damages.

On June 10, 2010, Pamela Gilbert was appointed to the board of directors of the AAI (American Antitrust Institute).

2011–Present 
On behalf of Consumers for Auto Reliability and Safety (CARS), Gilbert led the successful lobbying effort to pass a federal law prohibiting rental car companies from renting or selling recalled cars until they are repaired. Gilbert worked with Mrs. Cally Houck, whose two daughters were killed in a rental car that caught on fire and crashed as a result of an unrepaired defect that had been subject to a safety recall.  President Obama on December 4, 2015 signed into law the "Raechel and Jacqueline Houck Safe Rental Car Act" (H.R. 2198, S. 1173), sponsored by Reps. Capps, Jones, Schakowsky and Butterfield and Sens. Schumer, Boxer, McCaskill and others, as part of the Fixing America's Surface Transportation Act (FAST Act).
 
Gilbert represents SD3, LLC, which owns SawStop, a table saw manufacturer whose table saws are equipped with technology that stops a spinning saw blade in milliseconds when it comes in contact with human flesh.  Gilbert has worked with SawStop and a coalition of consumer protection groups in an effort to enact a mandatory safety standard so that all table saws contain injury mitigation technology to prevent amputations and other serious laceration injuries. The CPSC published a notice of proposed rulemaking in 2011  and in 2015 the commission's staff urged adoption of the new requirement.

Gilbert is working with a coalition of patients with diseases caused by asbestos exposure and their families to defeat the proposed Furthering Asbestos Claims Transparency (FACT) Act of 2015 (H.R. 526, S. 357). The proposal would require asbestos trusts to file quarterly reports about the payouts they make and personal information on the victims who receive them in a publicly accessible database. Opponents argue that this would violate the privacy of victims and use trust funds to meet the new administrative requirements, making it more difficult for asbestos claimants to receive timely and full compensation.

Notable writings 
In 2008, Gilbert wrote a chapter entitled "Consumer Product Safety Commission: Safety First" for Change for America: A Progressive Blueprint for the 44th President, published by the Center for American Progress and the New Democracy Project.

In 2010, Gilbert authored a chapter in Materials on Tort Reform by Professor Andrew Popper of the Washington College of Law at American University.

In 2012, Gilbert co-authored with Victoria Romanenko a chapter in Private Enforcement of the Antitrust Laws in the United States (edited by Albert A. Foer and Randy M. Stutz).

Controversy 
In 2001, Gilbert stepped down as executive director of the Consumer Product Safety Commission (CPSC) after President Bush sparked a constitutional controversy by seeking to replace the leadership of the Commission, citing his powers under Article Two of the United States Constitution.  Later, in 2008, Gilbert was mentioned as a possible appointee by President Barack Obama to be Chairman of the Commission.  However, her nomination was criticized on the grounds that while she was executive director of the CPSC, the agency was known for its "strident enforcement efforts" contrary to large business interests.

Personal life 
Gilbert is married to Charles Lewis, Professor of Journalism at American University, founder of the Center for Public Integrity, and a former producer for 60 Minutes.  With Lewis she raises two children, Cassandra and Gabriel.

See also 
 Cuneo Gilbert & LaDuca, LLP
 U.S. Consumer Product Safety Commission

References

External links 
Pamela Gilbert's profile on the Cuneo Gilbert & LaDuca website

Tufts University School of Arts and Sciences alumni
New York University School of Law alumni
Lawyers from Washington, D.C.
1958 births
Living people
People from New Brunswick, New Jersey